In the U.S. Air Force (USAF), a boom operator is an aircrew member aboard tanker aircraft who is responsible for safely and effectively transferring aviation fuel from one military aircraft to another during flight (known as aerial refueling, air refueling, in-flight refueling, air-to-air refueling, and tanking). The name boom operator implies that one "operates a boom" (the flying boom), which is a long, extendable metal arm attached to the rear underside of the tanker that the boom operator connects to the fuel receptacle of a receiving aircraft (the receiver). The boom operator also controls the refueling drogue, a basket attached to a flexible hose that trails the tanker, when using the probe-and-drogue system. The USAF officially designates the boom operator career field as "In-Flight Refueling" with a specialty code of 1A0X1. However, this designation is usually reserved for administrative paperwork such as enlistment contracts and performance reports, as boom operators themselves are rarely referred to as in-flight refueling specialists within the USAF. The title "Boom Operator" is most commonly used, in reference to the aircrew position they occupy on the airplane, as noted in USAF regulations and aircraft flight manuals. Fellow crew members affectionately address them as "boom" or "boomer" (though the use of the term "boom" in this article refers to the flying boom, not the boom operator).

The boom operator crew position was created in 1948 when Boeing developed the flying boom at the request of the USAF. Prior to this, when the only practical means of transferring fuel was through a hose, other crew members fulfilled the duty of operating the air refueling equipment, such as the hose reel operator in the DH-4B and C-1 and the line operator in the B-24D and KB-29M using the grappled-line looped hose system. In the modern U.S. military, the boom operator crew position only exists in USAF tankers equipped with a flying boom, such as the KC-135, KC-10, and the newly developed KC-46. For tanker aircraft not equipped with a flying boom, such as the KC-130, HC-130, and F/A-18E/F, the specific crew member(s) responsible for operating the air refueling equipment and supervising refueling operations varies by aircraft. Boom-equipped tankers have been obtained by several foreign countries as a result of USAF tanker procurement programs and U.S. foreign military sales. An estimated 63 boom-equipped tankers (KC-135, KC-10, A330 MRTT, KC-767, and KC-33) are operated by 14 foreign countries; in comparison, the USAF operates 457 KC-135 and KC-10 tankers.

Requirements
A boom operator must have a high school diploma or GED with 15 college credits.

Training
All boom operators first receive a month of training in flying tankers at Joint Base San Antonio, Texas. After this they spend three weeks in survival training. The boom operators of Boeing KC-135 Stratotankers are trained at Altus Air Force Base for four months.

Equipment
Boom operators are used in McDonnell Douglas KC-10 Extenders and Boeing KC-135 Stratotankers. The Boeing KC-46 Pegasus is currently being deployed for use in refueling.  The KC-10 station is in a rear-facing seat while the KC-135 is in a prone position. The KC-46 seats two operators in the front of the aircraft with 3D viewing screens fed by cameras. The future training program for the KC-46 for a boom operator is to be 59 days long, and the training time for a pilot is to be 82 days long.

Aircraft

This section refers to operational tankers manned by USAF boom operators since the development of the flying boom in 1948. For a complete list of U.S. military tankers, see List of United States military aerial refueling aircraft.

In Service

Under Development

Retired

Gallery

See also 

 Aircrew (Flight crew)

References

Military supporting service occupations
United States Air Force specialisms